Mizzi is a surname of Maltese origin. It may refer to:

As a surname
Amy Mizzi (born 1983), Australian actress
Bice Mizzi (1899–1985), Maltese pianist
Dennis Mizzi (born 1964), former Maltese professional footballer
Enrico Mizzi (1885–1950), Maltese politician and 6th Prime Minister of Malta
Fortunato Mizzi (1844–1905), Maltese politician
Jack Mizzi (born 2006), Maltese chess player
Konrad Mizzi (born 1977), Maltese politician
Marlene Mizzi (born 1954), Maltese politician
Philip Mizzi (born 1945), Maltese actor
Sorel Mizzi (born 1986), Canadian professional poker player
Suzanne Mizzi (1967–2011), Maltese-British model, singer, interior designer and artist
Yusuf ibn Abd al-Rahman al-Mizzi (1256–1342), Islamic scholar from the Levant

As a given name
Mizzi Günther (1879–1961), Bohemian-Viennese operetta soprano
Mizzi Kaspar (1864–1907), royal mistress of Rudolf, Prince of Austria

See also
Mitzi, a given name

Maltese-language surnames